Ado-Awaye is a town in Oyo State, Nigeria. It is popular for its hill (Oke Ado), upon which is a lake (Iyake), one of only two suspended lakes in the world.

References

Populated places in Oyo State
Tourist attractions in Oyo State